Andrias is a genus of giant salamanders. While extant species are only known from East Asia, several extinct species in the genus are known from late Oligocene and Neogene aged fossils collected in Europe and North America, indicating that the genus formerly had a much wider range.

Taxonomy
The generic name derives from Ancient Greek ἀνδριάς, "statue". The former name was Megalobatrachus, from Ancient Greek meaning "giant frog".

Species

Extant 

Based on genetic evidence, there may be more extant species in the genus. A study in 2018 found that A. davidianus sensu lato was a species complex that consisted of at least 5 different species. A. sligoi, which was formerly synonymized with A. davidianus, was revived in 2019 for one of these populations, and in 2022, another of these was described as A. jiangxiensis.

Extinct

References 

 AmphibiaWeb - Andrias japonicus. Accessed 2008-04-08.
 AmphibiaWeb - Andrias davidianus. Accessed 2008-04-08.
 Amphibian Species of the World 5.1. Accessed 2008-04-10.

Cryptobranchidae
Amphibian genera
Taxa named by Johann Jakob von Tschudi
Extant Miocene first appearances